Turkmenistan competed at the 2020 Summer Olympics in Tokyo. Originally scheduled to take place from 24 July to 9 August 2020, the Games were postponed to 23 July to 8 August 2021, due to the COVID-19 pandemic.  This was the nation's seventh consecutive appearance at the Summer Olympics in the post-Soviet era.

Polina Guryeva won the country's first ever medal by placing second in the women's 59 kg in weightlifting. With that achievement Turkmenistan became the last post-Soviet country to win a medal at the Olympics.

Medallist

Competitors
The following is the list of number of competitors in the Games.

Athletics

Turkmenistan received a universality slot from IAAF to send a male track and field athlete to the Olympics.

Field events

Judo

Turkmenistan entered one female judoka into the Olympic tournament based on the International Judo Federation Olympics Individual Ranking.

Swimming

Turkmenistan received a universality invitation from FINA to send two top-ranked swimmers (one per gender) in their respective individual events to the Olympics, based on the FINA Points System of June 28, 2021.

Weightlifting

Turkmen weightlifters qualified for five quota places at the games, based on the Tokyo 2020 Rankings Qualification List of 11 June 2021.

References

Olympics
Nations at the 2020 Summer Olympics
2020